The Honda CRF150F is an off road motorcycle that was introduced in 2003 as the successor to the Honda XR series. The 150F Is a bike for beginner to intermediate riders, teens or adults. It is mainly used for family recreation  and easy off road trails. It has a relatively soft suspension, wide seat and high ground clearance.
This motorcycle's primary design purpose is for trail riding or amateur hair scramble type races. With the manufacturer setup racing is not recommended. They are known for their reliability and ease of use and maintenance.

2003–2005
The 2003 CRF150F was styled after Honda's racing bikes, with tuned suspension and  engine. It had a 5-speed manual transmission, O ring chain drive, and the Pirelli MT18 tires. The front brake was a 240mm hydraulic disc brake.

2006 redesign
The biggest change for 2006 was to the engine. In other years, the 150F's engine was a smaller version of the 230F. Less power with almost the same or slightly more weight. In 2006, Honda totally reconfigured the engine with a different compression ratio, 9.5:1, and a bore and stroke of 57.3 × 57.8. The overall weight savings of the new  were significant with an increase in power as well. Another change was a new electric start system. The battery is concealed under the left sidepanel out of the way from water or mud. With the new light weight engine, the 2006 150F with extra electric start system now weighs about the same as the 2005 model.

In 2017, the CRF150F was discontinued and replaced by the CRF125FB.

Specifications
All specifications are manufacturer claimed.

References

CRF150
Off-road motorcycles
Motorcycles introduced in 2003